Moihi Te Matorohanga (fl. 1836–1865) was a notable New Zealand tribal tohunga and historian. Of Māori descent, he identified with the Ngāti Kahungunu iwi. He was born in Te Ewe-o-Tiina, Wairarapa, New Zealand  and active from about 1836.

References

1870s deaths
Ngāti Kahungunu people
New Zealand Māori religious leaders
Tohunga
Year of birth missing